The 1941 Vanderbilt Commodores football team was an American football team that represented Vanderbilt University in the Southeastern Conference during the 1941 college football season. In their second season under head coach Red Sanders, the Commodores compiled an 8–2 record (3–2 in conference play) and outscored opponents by a total of 260 to 89.  The Commodores played their home games at Dudley Field in Nashville, Tennessee.

The highlight of the season was a defeat of seventh-ranked Alabama in a driving rainstorm in Nashville; up to that time, only the second time in Commodore history where they defeated a ranked team. On November 9, Vanderbilt played the school's 439th game and defeated Georgia Tech, 14–7, for the 300th win in program history.

Two Vanderbilt players were selected by the Associated Press (AP) and the United Press (UP) as first-team players on the 1941 All-SEC football team: center Bob Gude (AP-1, UP-1) and fullback Jack Jenkins (AP-1, UP-1).

Schedule

References

Vanderbilt
Vanderbilt Commodores football seasons
Vanderbilt Commodores football